Cheap Records is a record label founded 1993 in Vienna, Austria by Patrick Pulsinger and Erdem Tunakan. Alongside Pulsinger and Tunakan, some artists who have recorded for the label include Christopher Just, Gerhard Potuznik and Robert Hood.

See also 
 List of record labels

External links 
 Official site
 Cheap Records @ Discogs.Com
 Cheap Records @ Last.fm
 Cheap Videos @ Youtube

Austrian record labels
Record labels established in 1993
Electronic music record labels